The  Liaison Squadron of 1st Air Command (Serbo-Croatian: Eskadrila za vezu 1. vazduhoplovne komande / Ескадрила за везу 1. ваздухопловне команде) was an aviation squadron of Yugoslav Air Force formed in 1952 at Pančevo airfield as Liaison Squadron of 1st Military district (Serbo-Croatian: Eskadrila za vezu 1. vojne oblasti / Ескадрила за везу 1. војне области).

Squadron was formed by order from December 17, 1951, on February 1, 1952, as part of  1st Military district . It was equipped with various training and liaison aircraft. Squadron was transformed into  Liaison Squadron of 1st Air Command by 1959. It was disbanded after 1959, estimated 1961.

Assignments
1st Military district (1952–1959)
1st Air Command (1959-1961 ?)

Previous designations
Liaison Squadron of 1st Air Command (1952–1959)
Liaison Squadron of 1st Air Command (1959-1961 ?)

Equipment
Polikarpov Po-2 (1952-1959)
Avro Anson MkXI (1952-1959)
Kaproni Bulgarski KB-11 Fazan (1952-1959)
Ikarus Kurir (1959-1961 ?)

References

Yugoslav Air Force squadrons
Military units and formations established in 1952